Stummerberg is a municipality in the Schwaz district in the Austrian state of Tyrol.

Geography
Stummerberg lies in the central Ziller valley above Stumm.

References

Cities and towns in Schwaz District